Jennifer K. Sweeney is an American poet.

Life
Sweeney is the author of  two poetry collections, most recently, How to Live on Bread and Music (Perugia Press, 2009), winner of the 2009 James Laughlin Award and the 2009 Perugia Press Prize. Her first collection, Salt Memory (Main Street Rag, 2006) won the 2006 Main Street Rag Poetry Award. Her poems have appeared in journals and magazines including Southern Review, Hunger Mountain, Crab Orchard, Spoon River and Passages North, where she won the 2009 Elinor Benedict Poetry Prize. Her honors include a Cultural Equities Grant from the San Francisco Arts Commission and a residency from Hedgebrook. Sweeney holds an M.F.A. from Vermont College of Fine Arts and serves as assistant editor for DMQ Review. Born in 1973, she grew up in Tolland, Connecticut.  After teaching in San Francisco for twelve years, she relocated to Kalamazoo, Michigan, with her husband, poet Chad Sweeney. She now lives in California.

Honors and awards
 2009 James Laughlin Award
 2009 Perugia Press Prize
 2006 Main Street Rag Poetry Award

Works

Poems online
 A few poems at Poets.org/Academy of American Poets
 "Happy People". Hunger Mountain, 2009.
 "How to Grow a Mushroom". The Pedestal, Issue 51.
 "How to Live on Bread and Music," "Comfort". Del Sol Review, Summer 2008, 15.
 "33 Umbrellas". DMQ Review, May 2007.
 "How to Make Armor". Parthenon West Review, Issue 5.
 "What Call," "How to Make a Game of Waiting". Electronic Poetry Review, Issue 8.
 "The Bird Carver". The Pedestal, Issue 35.
 "Crooked Little Teeth," "The Game of Life". The Adroit Journal, Issue 17.

Published works
 How to Live on Bread and Music, (Perugia Press, 2009)
 Salt Memory, (Main Street Rag Publications, 2006)

References

External links
 Reviews
 The Pedestal Magazine > Archives > ISSUE THIRTY-SEVEN: Dec (06)- Feb (07) > Reviews > Review by JoSelle Vanderhooft of Salt Memory by Jennifer K. Sweeney

Video/audio links
 "Of Gravity and Will". Moe's Books, Berkeley, CA, August 2008.
 "Full Poetry Reading at Moe's". Moe's Books, Berkeley, CA, August 2008.
 "Apology," "Ode to a Banana Slug". Parthenon West Review, Issue 1, 2004.

1973 births
Living people
Poets from Connecticut
Poets from Michigan
Vermont College of Fine Arts alumni
American women poets
21st-century American poets
21st-century American women writers